South Korea competed in the 2017 Asian Winter Games in Sapporo and Obihiro, Japan from 19 to 26 February. The country's goal for the games was a top two finish, and a record medal haul with at least 15 gold medals.

South Korea competed in all five sports (eleven disciplines). The team consisted of 141 athletes.

On 17 February 2017, it was announced that alpine skier Jung Dong-hyun would be the country's flagbearer during the parade of nations at the opening ceremony.

Background
One of the athletes hotels is the APA Hotel in Sapporo. The founder and president of this hotel chain, Toshio Motoya, who is a strong supporter of political and historical view aligned with those of Japan's right wing. For example, Motoya claimed that "Japanese aggression, the Nanking Massacre, and comfort women" were "fabricated stories" or "fictitious". His book is available in each of the guest rooms at the hotel. This created controversy, particularly in China, which caused the games organizers to ask the hotel to take appropriate actions and remove them from guest rooms. The Organizing Committee will gain exclusive access over the hotel from February 12, and an organization committee official said, "we can decide what is removed and placed in the guest rooms so that we don’t place any items that offend athletes, from not only China, but also any other nation”. Eventually both South Korea and China requested that their athletes stay at a different hotel, and the organizing committee obliged by changing their accommodations to the Sapporo Prince Hotel.

Medal summary

Medal table

Medalists
The following South Korean competitors won medals at the Games. In the by discipline sections below, medalists' names are bolded.

Gold medal

Silver medal

Bronze medal

Competitors
The following table lists the South Korean delegation per sport and gender.

Alpine skiing

South Korea sent 10 athletes (5 men and 5 women) to compete in the alpine skiing event.
Men

Women

Biathlon

South Korea sent 10 athletes (5 men and 5 women) to compete in the biathlon event.

Men

Women

Mixed

Cross-country skiing

Men
Kim Magnus

Curling

South Korea has entered both a men's and women's teams.

Men's tournament

Kim Soo-hyuk – Skip
Park Jong-duk – Third
Kim Tae-hwan – Second
Nam Yoon-ho – Lead
Yoo Min-hyeon – Alternate

Round-robin
South Korea has a bye in draw 3

Draw 1 
Saturday, February 18, 9:00

Draw 2
Saturday, February 18, 18:00

Draw 4
Monday, February 20, 13:30

Draw 5
Tuesday, February 21, 9:00

Draw 6
Tuesday, February 21, 18:00

Semifinals
Wednesday, February 22, 1:30

Bronze medal match
Thursday, February 23, 1:30

Women's tournament

Kim Eun-jung – Skip
Kim Kyeong-ae – Third
Kim Seon-yeong – Second
Kim Yeong-mi – Lead

Round-robin
South Korea has a bye in draw 1

Draw 2
Saturday, February 19, 9:00

Draw 3
Sunday, February 20, 9:00

Draw 4
Monday, February 20, 18:00

Draw 5
Tuesday, February 21, 13:30

Figure skating

Men's single

Women's single

Pairs

Ice dancing

Freestyle skiing

Ice hockey

South Korea has entered teams in both hockey tournaments. The men's team will compete in the top division.

Men's tournament

South Korea was represented by the following 23 athletes:

Matt Dalton (G)
Kyehoon Park (G)
Sunje Park (G)
Lee Donku (D)
Oh Hyunho (D)
Eric Regan (D)
Kim Wonjun (D)
Seo Yeongjun (D)
Kim Yoon-Hwan (D)
Bryan Young (D)
Cho Minho (F)
Shin Hyungyun (F)
Chong Hyun Lee (F)
Jeon Jungwoo (F)
Jin Kyu Park (F)
Shin Sanghoon (F)
Shin Sangwoo (F)
Kim Ki-Sung (F)
Michael Swift (F)
Mike Testwuide (F)
Kim Sang-Wook (F)
Park Woosang (F)
Kim Wonjung (F)

Legend
G– Goalie D = Defense F = Forward

Women's tournament

South Korea was represented by the following 20 athletes:

Han Do-hee (G)
Shin So-jung (G)
Eom Su-yeon (D)
Lee Kyou-sun (D)
Kim Se-lin (D)
Park Ye-eun (D)
Cho Mi-hwan (D)
Ko Hye-in (F)
Caroline Nancy Park (F)
Choi Yu-jung (F)
Park Jong-ah (F)
Choi Ji-yeon (F)
Kim Hee-won (F)
Lee Eun-ji (F)
Park Chae-lin (F)
Jo Su-sie (F)
Han Soo-jin (F)
Lee Min-ji (F)
Lee Yeon-jeong (F)
Jung Si-yun (F)

Legend: G = Goalie, D = Defense, F = Forward

Short track speed skating

Men
Lee Jung-su

Ski jumping

Snowboarding

Men

Women

Speed skating

South Korea's speed skating team consists of twenty athletes (10 men and 10 women).
Men
Cha Min-kyu
Mo Tae-bum
Kim Jin-su
Jang Won-hoon
Kim Min-seok
Joo Hyong-jun
Lee Seung-hoon
Lee Jin-yeong
Kim Cheol-min

Women
Lee Sang-hwa
Kim Min-sun
Park Seung-hi
Kim Hyun-yung
Kim Bo-reum
Park Ji-woo
Noh Seon-yeong
Jang Su-ji
Park Do-young

References

External links
8th Sapporo Asian Winter Games Organising Committee
2017 Sapporo Asian Winter Games at Korean Olympic Committee 

Nations at the 2017 Asian Winter Games
Asian Winter Games
South Korea at the Asian Winter Games